Upper Chapel is a hamlet  in the southern part of the county of Powys in mid Wales. It lies on the B4520, Brecon to Builth Wells road in the valley of the Afon Honddu. The south-flowing Honddu cuts deeply into the uplands of Mynydd Epynt north of Brecon. To the north and west of Upper Chapel lies the Army's Sennybridge Training Area (or 'SENTA').

The hamlet lies 3 miles to the north of its sister settlement, Lower Chapel. Upper Chapel lies within the community of Merthyr Cynog whilst Lower Chapel lies within the neighbouring Honddu Isaf.

Upper Chapel has a community hall called Merthyr Cynog Community Hall, which hosts various local events and meetings.

Upper Chapel used to have one pub, the Plough and Harrow, but it no longer operates.

References

Villages in Powys
Epynt